This was the second time India participated in Commonwealth Games after previous 1934 British Empire Games in London. India participated in few events this time mainly in cycling. But could not able to win single medal in these Games at Sydney in Australia.

References

Nations at the 1938 British Empire Games
India at the Commonwealth Games
1938 in Indian sport